Lovers Live is the first live album and third video album by English band Sade, released on 5 February 2002 by Epic Records. It was recorded at the Arrowhead Pond in Anaheim, California, on 20 September 2001 and at the Great Western Forum in Inglewood, California, on 21 September as part of the band's Lovers Rock Tour. The CD contains 13 tracks, while the DVD contains 22 tracks as well as special features. The live version of the track "Somebody Already Broke My Heart" was released as a single from the album.

Lovers Rock Tour
The album and DVD were recorded during the band's Lovers Rock Tour in September 2001. The tour ranked number 13 on Billboards year-end tally, grossing $26,488,293 million and drawing 491,151 audience members to 42 concerts. The tour featured India Arie and Youssou N'Dour as the opening acts.

Critical reception

Brad Kohlenstein of AllMusic commented, "Above all things, the record is smooth. Sade's new songs mix seamlessly with classics from every stage of her career. An energetic eight-piece band breathes new life to the old tunes and offers another look at the Lovers Rock material. The highlight, of course, is Sade's intoxicating voice and it's clear that the audience is under her spell from her first breath. Lovers Live is a sum greater than any one of its parts, but there are some standout moments, like the rocking version of 'Paradise,' 'The Sweetest Gift' (a song written for her daughter), and a haunting rendition of 'Jezebel.' Even though the recordings were taking from various performances throughout the tour, the album feels like one cohesive performance and makes for a great listen all the way through."

J. Victoria Sanders of PopMatters noted, "It may be easier for Sade to become even more of an international force if her live show reflected more energy and passion that is sometimes offered in her studio work. She will always be appreciated for her sweetness and the temperate nature of her songs. There's nothing wrong with being cool and smooth – we all need some of that sometimes. But when and if Sade can move into a different musical space where she is brave enough to improvise onstage or surrender to the music in vocal phrases and not just words, she will be able to rise to legendary status. After all, it's not hard to love her – 48 million records sold worldwide prove that. It's just a bit of a stretch to love her formulaic live recording. Sade fans will see Lovers Live as a triumph. Music connoisseurs will see it as a bit dull (except for the eager fans at the concert who whooped and hollered), understanding that a woman capable of creating such beautiful music, is capable of a much more compelling performance."

Commercial performance
Lovers Live reached number 10 on the US Billboard 200 and number 51 on the UK Albums Chart, Sade's first album to miss the top 20 in the United Kingdom. The album was certified gold by the Recording Industry Association of America (RIAA) on 7 March 2002, and had sold 562,000 copies in the United States by February 2006, while the DVD was certified platinum on 30 January 2003, denoting shipments in excess of 100,000 copies.

Track listing

Notes
 "Slave Song" contains an excerpt from "African Race" performed by The Abyssinians and written by Donald Manning, Neville Bernard Collins and Linford Elijah Manning.

Personnel
Credits adapted from the liner notes of Lovers Live.

Sade
 Sade Adu – vocals
 Stuart Matthewman – guitar, saxophone
 Andrew Hale – keyboards
 Paul S. Denman – bass guitar

Additional musicians
 Ryan Waters – guitar
 Pete Lewinson – drums
 Karl Van Den Bossche – percussion
 Leroy Osbourne – vocals, guitar, flute
 Tony Momrelle – vocals

Technical

Concert sound
 Charlie Bouis – recording engineering
 Eric Johnston – engineering assistance
 Ian Duncan – Pro Tools recording
 Mike Pela – audio mixing
 Andrew Nichols – mixing assistance
 Howard Page – FOH sound engineering

Concert film
 Sophie Muller – direction
 Rob Small – production
 Steven Chivers – director of photography

Artwork
 Intro – design
 Idea – imaging

Charts

Weekly charts

Year-end charts

Certifications

! colspan="3"| Video
|-

! colspan="3"| Album
|-

Release history

References

2002 live albums
2002 video albums
Epic Records live albums
Epic Records video albums
Live video albums
Sade (band) live albums